Ailene Fields (born 1948) is an American sculptor and stone carving teacher known for her skills in stone, bronze and acrylic.  Her subjects often call upon mythology and fairy tales for inspiration.

Biography

Born Eileen Rubin in 1948 in Brooklyn, New York, she graduated with a degree in English and Greek mythology from Lehman College, New York City, in 1973. A self-taught potter, she next studied the human figure with Bruno Lucchesi at The New School for Social Research, New York City, in 1980. Lucchesi sent her to Sculpture Center, New York City to further her practical education as a sculptor. After mastering the figure she became adept at both stone carving and sculpting for bronze casting. In 1967 she married Dr. David Fields with whom she has two sons, Marc and Adam. 
 
Fields' first one-person exhibition was in 1987 at the Lavaggi Gallery in New York City. Since that time, her work has been continually exhibited in American art galleries. She has had solo museum exhibitions at the Bergen Museum of Art & Science, Paramus, New Jersey, and The Appleton Museum of Art, Ocala, Florida. Solo gallery exhibitions include CFM Gallery, NYC, NY; Roslyn Sailor Fine Arts, Margate, NJ; Broadhurst Gallery, Pinehurst, NC; Southern Vermont Art Center, Manchester, VT; Pendragon Gallery, Annapolis, MD; White Lights Gallery, Nyack, NY; Barbara Debetz Gallery, NYC, NY; Lavaggi Gallery, NYC, NY; and Six Summit Gallery in Ivoryton, CT. She has also been represented in well over 25 group exhibitions across the United States. She has taught stone carving at Sculpture Center and The Educational Alliance in NYC and is currently teaching at The Compleat Sculptor in New York City, one of the largest sculpture suppliers in the world, which she co-owns with Marc Fields. She is represented by CFM Gallery and Six Summit Gallery.

Ailene is currently working on opening the Skylands Museum of Art in Lafayette, NJ.  She hopes to open the Museum by 2022, stating "I don’t want it to be a museum where everything is sterile."

Sculptures

Fields' sculptures often feature animals, mythological figures and architectural elements. Often mixing stone with bronze, her sculptures highlight the essence of the subjects, most often in an optimistic and insightful manner. Her stone series Sacred Spaces represents places of contemplation and peace, which she feels are mandatory for our times. Themes in her work are evocative of dreams, and magic calling forth the qualities that make us human.

Public art installations

Fantastic Creatures 2020 
Starting in late 2019 and running through summer 2020, in conjunction with Six Summit Gallery and featuring pieces by sculptor Gina Miccinilli, Fields exhibited three public art installations of fantastical representational works at Bella Abzug Park at Hudson Yards, Port Authority Bus Terminal, and Dag Hammarskjold Plaza.

Further reading 
 "Annual Presentation of Sculpture Editions." Art Business News, Long Island, NY, August 1996.
 Becker, Marilyn. "Ailene Fields Bringing Nature Forms to Life in Stone." Manhattan Arts, NYC, April - May 1991.
 Dengal, Janet. "A Salute to Women in the Arts: Sharing of Dreams and Dialogue." Northern Valley News, Cresskill, NJ, April 1990.
 Forbes, Jamie Ellin. "Then & Now Ailene Fields." Fine Art Magazine, Ronkonkoma, New York, Fall, 2011.
 Gilbert, Sidney. "Ailene Fields: Three Dimensional Mythology." Artspeak, NYC, April 1989.
 Larose, Tom. "Once Upon a Time."  Fine Art Magazine, Ronkonkoma, NY, Spring 1999.
McCormack, Ed. "CFM Books Captures Ailene Fields' Fantastic Critters Between Hard Covers." Gallery & Studio, NYC, June/July 2011.
 "On Display." Asbury Park Press, November 1992.
 Raynor, Vivien. "ART; Stone Sculpture Society Exhibits Work." New York Times 11 Sept. 1988. Infotrac Newsstand.  Retrieved 18 May 2014.
 Shaw, Alexandra. "Ailene Fields Shows Sculpture by the Sea Shore." Manhattan Arts, NYC, June - August 1991.
 Wagner, J.L. "Ailene Fields a Sculptor on the Cutting Edge...of Alabaster." Sunstorm, Ronkonkoma, NY, April, 1990.
 Weiss, Paulette. "French's American on 57th." Where Magazine, NYC, July 1997.
 Wetman, Dennis. "Ailene Fields' Enchanted Menagerie." Manhattan Arts, NYC, October,1989.
 Zukerman, Neil; Larose, Thomas, Phd; Birdseye, Scott; MacCormack, Ed; Fields, Dr. David. “Out of the Nowhere into the Here - Ailene Fields, Sculptor." CFM Publishing, NYC, 2011.

References

External links 
 The Compleat Sculptor, Inc.
 Ailene Fields Sculptures at CFM Gallery
 Six Summit Gallery Artists
 Ailene Fields - Broadhurst Gallery
 Ailene Fields' Plea for Sanity and the Pure of Heart

20th-century American sculptors
21st-century American sculptors
American women sculptors
Living people
1948 births
20th-century American women artists
21st-century American women artists
Artists from Brooklyn
Lehman College alumni
The New School alumni
Sculptors from New York (state)